Blake Costanzo (born April 14, 1984) is a former American football linebacker. He was signed by the New York Jets as an undrafted free agent in 2006. He played college football at Lafayette.

Costanzo has also played for the Buffalo Bills, Cleveland Browns, and Chicago Bears.

He is currently an assistant coach at Ramapo High School (New Jersey).

Early years
He played high school football at Ramapo High School in his New Jersey hometown as a linebacker and a tight end. He helped lead his team to two state championships. He played linebacker and tight end, and was awarded the Defensive Player of the Year Award. In his high school career, he recorded 210 tackles, 24 sacks, and 11 blocked punts. He was named three times to the All-League first-team, as well as the All-Bergen County first-team. In 2001, he was named the Defensive Player of the Year after recording 111 tackles, 15 sacks, and five blocked punts.

College career

2002
In 2002, Costanzo recorded 34 tackles and finish fourth among the Leopard freshmen in tackles. He also made two sacks, while leading the team in forced fumbles with two.

2003
In 2003, he ranked third among the Leopards and seventh in the Patriot League with 94 total tackles. He also blocked a three kicks, and recorded 13 stops and blocked a PAT against the Colgate Raiders. He also recorded 12 tackles and blocked two punts against Towson. He also recorded 12 tackles against Georgetown and Columbia, as well as recording his first career interception against Holy Cross.

2004
In 2004, he was the team's Most Outstanding Linebacker, as he ranked second on the team and seventh in the Patriot League with 93 tackles. He had 5.5 sacks, and recorded 1.5 sacks against Bucknell. Against the Holy Cross Crusaders, he made 12 tackles, forced a fumble, and blocked an extra point. Against the Columbia Lions, he made 11 tackles, a sack and a fumble recovery. Against the Fordham Rams, he recorded a sack vs. Fordham, as well as blocking a fourth-quarter field goal against Colgate, along with recording a sack against Delaware.

College statistics

Professional career

New York Jets

Costanzo was signed as an undrafted free agent by the New York Jets in 2006, and was on the practice squad until 2007.

Buffalo Bills

Costanzo played for the Buffalo Bills in 2007 and 2009 seasons.

Cleveland Browns

In the 2010 season, Costanzo played in ten games before injuring his groin and being placed on injured reserve.

San Francisco 49ers

Costanzo was signed by the San Francisco 49ers in 2011. Costanzo was notable for forcing a fumble in the 2011–12 NFL playoffs against the New Orleans Saints on a kickoff and recovering another, en route to a 49ers 36–32 victory.

In 61 career games, Costanzo has recorded 71 tackles on special teams with eight forced fumble/fumble recoveries (four force fumbles, four fumble recoveries). In the 2011 season, Costanzo recorded 17 special teams tackles, which ranks second on the 49ers.

Chicago Bears

Costanzo was signed by the Chicago Bears in 2012 on a two-year deal. General manager Phil Emery commented, "Blake has done some dynamic things as a special teams player, as is evident from his four forced fumbles with one of them in a playoff game against New Orleans this past year."

Costanzo ended the 2013 season leading the Bears with 17 special teams tackles.

San Francisco 49ers

On June 3, 2014, Costanzo signed a one-year deal to return to the 49ers. He was released later in the year.

Career statistics
Source Retrieved on September 2, 2014

References

External links
Buffalo Bills bio
Chicago Bears bio
Lafayette bio
ESPN bio

1984 births
Living people
People from Franklin Lakes, New Jersey
Players of American football from New Jersey
Ramapo High School (New Jersey) alumni
American football linebackers
Lafayette Leopards football players
New York Jets players
Rhein Fire players
Buffalo Bills players
Cleveland Browns players
San Francisco 49ers players
Chicago Bears players